Dray may refer to:
 Cart, also called dray in Australia and New Zealand
 Dray horse, a horse that pulls a dray, also called a draft horse
 Dray (name)
 Dray Prescot series, science fiction novels by Kenneth Bulmer under the pseudonym Alan Burt Akers
 Dray, an uncommon spelling of drey, the nest of a tree squirrel or flying squirrel
 Flatbed trolley, type of four-wheeled trolley with no sides, also known as a dray
 A delivery wagon

See also 
 Drayage